Mount Pinacle is a mountain located in Coaticook, Quebec Canada. Experienced rock climbers may scale the face of the hill starting from Lake Lyster. The mountain is exploited for its abundance of maples, with a sugar bush running along a portion of its trails.

History
The hill has been officially known as Le Pinacle since 1978.

In 2013, part of the hill was closed to rock climbing due to the nesting of peregrine falcons on Mount Pinacle.

In June 2014, a 10-year-old child on a field trip went to the emergency department after surviving a 10-metre fall down a crevice on the mountain. Approximately a dozen firefighters were onsite for two hours rescuing the child, although he was not gravely injured.

References

External links
  Official website of the park
  Coaticook Historical Society's page on Mont Pinacle

Mountains of Quebec under 1000 metres
Landforms of Estrie
Appalachian Mountains